The 2022 Polish Super Cup was the 32nd Polish Super Cup, an annual Polish football match played between the reigning winners of the Ekstraklasa and Polish Cup. The Ekstraklasa champions Lech Poznań faced Polish Cup winners  Raków Częstochowa.

Raków were the defending champions and successfully defended their title by defeating Lech Poznań 2–0.

Match

See also
2021–22 Ekstraklasa
2021–22 Polish Cup

References

2022
2022–23 in Polish football
Sports competitions in Warsaw
August 2022 events in Poland